Alan Thorpe may refer to:

 Alan Thorpe (rugby union), Australian rugby union player
 Alan Thorpe (footballer) (born 1968), Australian rules footballer and media commentator